Manuel Rodrigues (born 16 March 1905 – deceased)  was a Portuguese footballer who played as a forward.

External links 
 
 

1905 births
Portuguese footballers
Association football forwards
Portugal international footballers
Year of death missing